Nerita undata is a species of sea snail, a marine gastropod mollusk in the family Neritidae.

Synonyms
 Nerita undata quadricolor Gmelin, 1791: synonym of Nerita quadricolor Gmelin, 1791
 Nerita undata var. micronesica E. von Martens, 1887: synonym of Nerita maura Récluz, 1842 (junior synonym)

Description
Habitat: rocky cliffs (Ruwa, 1984 <109>).
Up to 4 cm, with radial ridges on the shell surface; columella with three teeth. Pale in colour with variable darker markings, sometimes uniformly bluish-black, pale interior.

Distribution
This marine species occurs in the Indo-Pacific. (Richmond, 1997) and off Papua New Guinea.

Habitat: littoral fringe rocks.

References

 Hombron, J.B. & Jacquinot, C.H. (1842–1854). Atlas d'histoire Naturelle zoologie par MM. Hombron et Jacquinot, chirurgiens de l'expédition. Voyage au Pole Sud et dans l'Océanie sur les corvettes l'Astrolabe et la Zélée éxecuté par ordre du roi pendant les années 1837–1838–1839–1840 sous le commandement de M. Dumont-d'Urville, capitaine de vaisseau, publié sous les auspices du département de la marine et sous la direction supérieure de M. Jacquinot, capitaine de vaisseau, commandant de la Zélée. Zoologie. Gide & Cie, Paris. 
 Kei LWK. & Lau SCK. (1994). Baseline information survey of shelter island  – a potential marine park. Final report. Submitted to the Agriculture and Fisheries Department, The Hong Kong SAR Government
 Drivas, J. & Jay, M. (1987). Coquillages de La Réunion et de l'Île Maurice. Collection Les Beautés de la Nature. Delachaux et Niestlé: Neuchâtel. ISBN 2-603-00654-1. 159 pp
 Jarrett, A.G. (2000) Marine Shells of the Seychelles. Carole Green Publishing, Cambridge, xiv + 149 pp. NIZT 682
 Steyn, D.G. & Lussi, M. (1998) Marine Shells of South Africa. An Illustrated Collector's Guide to Beached Shells. Ekogilde Publishers, Hartebeespoort, South Africa, ii + 264 pp.
 Liu, J.Y. [Ruiyu] (ed.). (2008). Checklist of marine biota of China seas. China Science Press. 1267 pp.
 Fowler, O. (2016). Seashells of the Kenya coast. ConchBooks: Harxheim. Pp. 1–170

External links
 Linnaeus, C. (1758). Systema Naturae per regna tria naturae, secundum classes, ordines, genera, species, cum characteribus, differentiis, synonymis, locis. Editio decima, reformata (10th revised edition), vol. 1: 824 pp. Laurentius Salvius: Holmiae
 Gould, A. A. (1852). Mollusca and shells. In: United States Exploring Expedition during the years 1838, 1839, 1840, 1841, 1842 under the command of Charles Wilkes. Boston. 12: 1–510; atlas 1856: 1-16
 Sowerby, G. B., III. (1903). Descriptions of fourteen new species of marine molluscs from Japan. Annals and Magazine of Natural History, Series 7. 12: 496–501.
 Martens, E. von. (1856–1889). Die Gattungen Nerita und Neritopsis. In: W. Kobelt, Ed. Systematisches Conchylien-Cabinet von Martini und Chemnitz. Neu herausgegeben und vervollständigt. Zweiten Bandes elfte Abtheilung. 2 (11): 1–147, plates A, 1-15. Nürnberg: Bauer & Raspe
 Dekker, H. (2000). The Neritidae from the circumarabian seas. Vita Marina. 47(2): 29-64

Neritidae
Gastropods described in 1758
Taxa named by Carl Linnaeus